Bradstreet Gate, on the perimeter of Harvard Yard in Cambridge, Massachusetts, is a wrought-iron gate opposite Memorial Hall. In 1997 it was dedicated to Anne Bradstreet on the 25th anniversary of female students living in Harvard's freshman dormitories. A plaque with a quote from one of Bradstreet's poems was added in 2003.

References

External links
 

1997 establishments in Massachusetts
Buildings and structures completed in 1997
Gates in the United States
Harvard University